Jokers of the Scene, composed of Linus Booth (also known as DJ Booth), and Chris Macintyre (also known as Chameleonic), are a Canadian Techno/Electronic production and DJ duo.

History
Booth and Macintyre formed Jokers of the Scene in Ottawa, Ontario in 2003 as loft party disc jockeys; they played their own recorded tracks and remixes, as well as hosting other local rappers.

Jokers of the Scene evolved into a full-time partnership after signing a recording deal with Fool's Gold Records in 2007. They later moved to Toronto, where Spinner Magazine reported on their party organizing and remixing, noting their "early '90s techno-influenced DJing style."

In 2009 the pair's track "Change Up" appeared on the BeatPort chart.

In 2011, Britain's NME Magazine voted their remix of Salem's "Asia" #19 on their "50 Best Remixes Ever" list. In 2012 the pair released an EP, J0T5, which included tracks in a variety of styles. Their 2014 album, End Scene, was a change from their earlier heavy electro music to a more experimental sound.

Discography

Albums
 End Scene (2014)

Extended plays
 Y’all Know the Name - EP (2008)
 Acid Bag (2008)
 Baggy Bottom Boys (2009)
 Joking Victim - EP (2010)
 Revolting Joks (2010)
 Killing Jokes - EP (2012)
 J0T5 RMXD - EP (2012)
 J0T5 - EP (2012)
 Endless Scene (2014)

Compilations
 Scion Sampler, Vol. 22: Fool's Gold Remixed (2008)
 Fool’s Gold Vol. 1 (2010)

References
Citations

External links
 Jokers-of-the-Scene at Fool's Gold Records
 http://www.soundcloud.com/Jokers-of-the-Scene

Musical groups established in 2003
Musical groups from Ottawa
Canadian electronic music groups
2003 establishments in Ontario